Fernville is a census-designated place (CDP) in Columbia County, Pennsylvania, United States. It is part of Northeastern Pennsylvania. The population was 556 at the 2010 census. It is part of the Bloomsburg-Berwick micropolitan area.

Geography
Fernville is located in western Columbia County at  (41.003980, -76.465813), across Fishing Creek from Bloomsburg, the county seat. Fernville is in the southeastern corner of Hemlock Township.

Demographics

As of the census of 2000, there were 488 people, approximately 196 households, and 149 families residing in the CDP. The population density was 599.6 people per square mile (232.6/km). There were 209 housing units at an average density of 256.8/sq mi (99.6/km). The racial makeup of the CDP was 96.52% White, 1.23% African American, 0.61% Asian, 1.23% from other races, and 0.41% from two or more races. Hispanic or Latino of any race were 1.43% of the population.

There were 196 households, out of which 30.6% had children under the age of 18 living with them, 66.8% were married couples living together, 6.1% had a female householder with no husband present, and 23.5% were non-families. 20.9% of all households were made up of individuals, and 10.2% had someone living alone who was 65 years of age or older. The average household size was 2.49 and the average family size was 2.81.

In the CDP, the population was spread out, with 24.0% under the age of 18, 5.3% from 18 to 24, 28.7% from 25 to 44, 27.0% from 45 to 64, and 15.0% who were 65 years of age or older. The median age was 40 years. For every 100 females, there were 96.8 males. For every 100 females age 18 and over, there were 88.3 males.

The median income for a household in the CDP was $43,571, and the median income for a family was $53,750. Males had a median income of $33,750 versus $24,107 for females. The per capita income for the CDP was $29,098. About 2.6% of families and 4.4% of the population were below the poverty line, including 6.0% of those under age 18 and 5.4% of those age 65 or over.

References

Bloomsburg–Berwick metropolitan area
Census-designated places in Columbia County, Pennsylvania
Census-designated places in Pennsylvania